The selection process for the 1944 Winter Olympics consisted of three bids, and saw Cortina d'Ampezzo, Italy, be selected ahead of Montreal, Quebec, Canada, and Oslo, Norway. The selection was made at the 31st IOC Session in London, Great Britain, on 9 June 1939. The games were ultimately not held due to the Second World War.  Cortina d'Ampezzo was ultimately awarded a Winter Olympics in 1956.

Results

References

Bids
 
1939 in London
Events in London
June 1939 events